Heather Young (born Patricia Kay Paterson, April 1, 1945) is an American former actress who is best known for playing the character Betty Hamilton on the television series Land of the Giants.

Life and career
Young was born in Bremerton, Washington.  She began her entertainment career as a singer at Disneyland.  In 1967, she had a number of small roles in shows such as the Batman television series and the courtroom series Judd for the Defense. In 1968, she married David Youkstetter and now goes by the name Patricia Youkstetter.

Her first experience of working with Irwin Allen was in the final episode of The Time Tunnel called "Town of Terror". She played a regular role as Betty Ann Hamilton on Allen's next series Land of the Giants. After the cancellation of the show and appearing in the 1972 TV movie Oh, Nurse!, Young gave up acting to concentrate on her family.

Young returned to television briefly in a two-part episode in Galactica 1980, appearing in the second part called "The Night the Cylons Landed".

See also
A Guide for the Married Man

References

External links

American television actresses
Living people
1945 births
People from Bremerton, Washington
21st-century American women